Sisi Virginia Khampepe (born 8 January 1957) is a retired judge of the Constitutional Court of South Africa.

Background
Khampepe was born in Soweto. She obtained her B Proc from the University of Zululand and her LLM degree at Harvard Law School. She was admitted as an attorney in 1985 and worked at Bowman Gilfillan in private practice, specialising in labour law. In 1995 she was appointed a member of the Truth and Reconciliation Commission. From 1999 she was Deputy National Director of Public Prosecutions in the National Prosecuting Authority.

Appointments
In 2000 Khampepe was appointed as a judge of the Transvaal Provincial Division of the High Court, (now known as the Gauteng Division). In 2007 she was also appointed to the Labour Appeal Court, and in 2009 she was appointed to the Constitutional Court by President Jacob Zuma.In 2021 she was appointed as the acting chief justice of the apex court.

References

Judges of the Constitutional Court of South Africa
South African barristers
1957 births
Living people
South African women in politics
Constitutional court women judges
South African women judges
South African women lawyers
20th-century South African lawyers
21st-century South African judges
University of Zululand alumni
Harvard Law School alumni
20th-century women lawyers
21st-century women judges